James Dent may refer to:

James S. Dent, American politician
Jim Dent (born 1939), American golfer
Jim Dent (author) (born 1953), American author and sportswriter
Jimmy Dent, a character in Across the Continent
James C. Dent House, a historic home in Washington, D.C.